The X Factor was an Australian television reality music competition, based on the original UK series, to find new singing talent; the winner of which received a Sony Music Australia recording contract. Season 6 premiered on the Seven Network on 13 July 2014 and ended on 20 October 2014. Luke Jacobz returned as host, while Dannii Minogue, Redfoo, Natalie Bassingthwaighte and Ronan Keating returned as judges. Comedy duo Luke & Wyatt joined the sixth season as the hosts of the online spin-off show The Fan Factor. The winner was Marlisa Punzalan and her winner's single "Stand by You" was released after the final. Punzalan became the youngest winner of the show at 15 years old and was the first contestant from the Girls category to do so. She was mentored by Keating, who won as mentor for the second time after previously mentoring season two winner Altiyan Childs in 2010.

Open auditions in front of the show's producers took place in 13 cities from November 2013 to January 2014. The successful auditionees chosen by the producers were then invited back to the last set of auditions that took place in front of the judges and a live studio audience in April 2014. Following auditions was super bootcamp, where all four judges worked together and collectively chose 24 acts, including six from each of the four categories: Boys, Girls, Over 25s and Groups. After super bootcamp was the home visits round, where each judge reduced their six acts to three, with assistance from guest mentors James Blunt, John Legend, Jennifer Lopez, Jessica Mauboy and Nicole Scherzinger. The live shows began on 10 August 2014. This was the first season of The X Factor Australia to feature a wildcard in the live shows as the thirteenth contestant.

Judges

After the previous season concluded, the show confirmed that Keating, Redfoo, Bassingthwaighte and Minogue will all return for this season. Additionally, Minogue's confirmation on 24 February 2014, meant she would not return as a judge to the UK show for the 2014 UK series to replace Nicole Scherzinger despite popular demand in the UK for her to return to UK show in 2014. Scherzinger was eventually replaced by former judge Mel B.

Selection process

Auditions
Open auditions in front of the show's producers took place in 13 cities and ran from November 2013 to January 2014. Online and DVD auditions were also held for those who could not attend the open auditions. The auditionees chosen by the producers were invited back to the last set of auditions that took place in front of the judges and a live studio audience. These auditions were filmed at the Hisense Arena in Melbourne on 4, 5 and 6 April, and at the Qantas Credit Union Arena in Sydney on 9, 10, 11 and 12 April.

Super bootcamp
The super bootcamp stage of the competition was held at The Star in Pyrmont, New South Wales. Filming began in late April 2014. The first day of bootcamp saw judges Ronan Keating, Natalie Bassingthwaighte, Redfoo and Dannii Minogue split each category into collaborations. The male and female soloists were put into ensembles of four within their category, the Over 25s were put into ensembles of three, and the acts from the Groups category were put into pairs. Each collaboration was given a list of songs which they had to choose from and only had 24 hours to rehearse. On the second day, each collaboration performed their chosen song for the judges. At the end of the day, a select group of soloists from the Boys and Girls categories were first requested by the judges to return to the stage to form a boy band (consisting of Ellis Hall, Harry Target and Joel Watson) and a girl group (consisting of Serenity, Tahnie Cristini, Chaska Halliday and Nada Leigh Nasser). The judges then sent home half of the 100 acts.

On the third day, each judge found out which category they would be mentoring, and the remaining 48 acts each had a one-on-one mentoring session with their mentor. Bassingthwaighte was given the Boys, Keating was given the Girls, Redfoo was given the Over 25s and Minogue was given the Groups category. On the fourth day, each act individually performed one song to the judges and a live audience of one thousand. On the fifth and final day of bootcamp, the judges revealed which acts they put through to home visits.

The 24 successful acts were:
Boys: Jaymie Deboucherville, James Johnston, Adrien Nookadu, Dean Ray, Tee, Jesse Teinaki
Girls: Alice Bottomley, Sydnee Carter, Shanell Dargan, Chloe Papandrea, Marlisa Punzalan, Caitlyn Shadbolt
Over 25s: Reigan Derry, Jason Heerah, Ryan Imlach, Rochelle Pitt, Stephanie Totino, Amali Ward 
Groups: Brothers3, MajikHoney, Paris Inc., Trill, XOX, Younger Than Yesterday

Home visits and wildcards
The final round of the selection process, the home visits, saw each judge take their remaining six acts to exclusive locations around the world. Bassingthwaighte and Keating took the Boys and Girls to New York City, Redfoo took the Over 25s to Las Vegas, and Minogue took the Groups to an exclusive location in Sydney. On the first day, each act had a one-on-one mentoring session with their mentor. Minogue was assisted by Jessica Mauboy during the mentoring sessions for the Groups. On the second day of home visits, each act performed one song to their mentor and guest mentor. Bassingthwaighte was assisted by American Idol judge Jennifer Lopez, Keating was assisted by John Legend, Redfoo was assisted by former X Factor UK judge Nicole Scherzinger (who got replaced by Mel B as of UK Series 11, and Minogue was assisted by James Blunt. After the performances, the judges along with their guest mentors, narrowed down the acts to three each. On the third and final day, the judges revealed which acts they put through to the live shows.

Key:
 – Wildcard winner

At the end of home visits, it was announced that each judge could bring back one eliminated act from their category, who did not make the top twelve, as their wildcard. Bassingthwaighte chose Jesse Teinaki, Keating chose Alice Bottomley, Redfoo chose Ryan Imlach, and Minogue chose Brothers3. The public then voted for which of the four wildcards would become the thirteenth contestant. Brothers3 were announced as the wildcard winners during the first live show on 10 August 2014.

Acts 

Key:
 – Winner
 – Runner-Up
 – Wildcard (Live Shows)

Live shows

Results summary
Colour key
 Act in Team Dannii
 Act in Team Redfoo 
 Act in Team Natalie Bassingthwaighte
 Act in Team Ronan

  – Act with the most votes
  – Act in the bottom two or three and had to perform in the final showdown
  – Act received the fewest public votes and was automatically eliminated 

Notes
1 Minogue was not required to vote as there was already a majority.
2 For the first time in the show's history and only for week five, the positions of the public votes were revealed in the order that the public voted based on the live performances that week.
3 Bassingthwaighte was absent for the week six showdown. As a result, three unanimous votes were required for an act to be eliminated. However, as Redfoo and Keating voted to save their own acts, Minogue abstained and the public vote was counted, resulting in Pitt's elimination.
4 For the first time in the show's history and only for week seven, a bottom three was featured.

Live show details

Week 1 (10/11 August)
 Theme: Judges' choice
 Group performance: "Geronimo"
 Celebrity performers: Dami Im ("Gladiator") and Guy Sebastian ("Come Home With Me")

 Judges' vote to eliminate
 Redfoo: Trill – based his decision on the live performance and final showdown performances and who really wanted it more.
 Minogue: Adrien Nookadu – backed her own act, Trill.
 Bassingthwaighte: Trill – backed her own act, Adrien Nookadu.
 Keating: Trill – went with his gut.

 Notes
 On 16 August 2014, Brothers3's performance of "Just the Way You Are" debuted at number 99 on the ARIA Singles Chart. The following week, it moved up to a new peak of number 98.

Week 2 (17/18 August)
 Theme: Legends
 Group performance: "Get the Girl Back" and "MMMBop" with Hanson
 Celebrity performers: Ella Henderson ("Ghost") and G.R.L. ("Ugly Heart")

 Judges' vote to eliminate
 Redfoo: Younger Than Yesterday – based the decision on all performances so far.
 Keating: Younger Than Yesterday – stated that XOX had more to improve.
 Bassingthwaighte: Younger Than Yesterday – went with her gut.
 Minogue was not required to vote as there was already a majority and did not say how she would have voted as both acts were in her category.

 Notes
On 23 August 2014, Brothers3's performance of "Always on My Mind" debuted at number 73 on the ARIA Singles Chart.

Week 3 (24/25 August)
 Theme: Decades Challenge
 Group performance: "Boom Clap"
 Celebrity performers: Jimmy Barnes featuring Diesel ("I'd Die to Be with You Tonight") and Gabrielle Aplin ("Please Don't Say You Love Me")

 Judges' vote to eliminate
 Keating: Adrien Nookadu – backed his own act, Sydnee Carter.
 Bassingthwaighte: Sydnee Carter – backed her own act, Adrien Nookadu.
 Redfoo: Adrien Nookadu – saw a growth in Carter and wanted to see what else she could do.
 Minogue: Sydnee Carter – felt that Nookadu had more to succeed.

With the acts in the bottom two receiving two votes each, the result went to deadlock and reverted to the earlier public vote. Nookadu received the fewest votes and was eliminated.

 Notes
Each mentor was given a different decade to choose their remaining acts songs from, including the 70s, 80s, 90s and now.
On 30 August 2014, the performances of four acts entered the ARIA Singles Chart. Dean Ray's performance of "Reckless" debuted at number 50, Sydnee Carter's performance of "Video Killed the Radio Star" debuted at number 63, Reigan Derry's performance of "Chandelier" debuted at number 81, and Brothers3's performance of "Happy Birthday Helen" debuted at number 86.

Week 4 (31 August/1 September)
 Theme: Top 10 Hits
 Group performance: "Army of Two"
 Celebrity performers: Redfoo ("New Thang") and Paloma Faith ("Only Love Can Hurt Like This")

 Judges' vote to eliminate
 Keating: XOX – felt that Tee had more to develop.
 Bassingthwaighte: XOX – backed her own act, Tee.
 Minogue: Tee – backed her own act, XOX.
 Redfoo: XOX – stated that Tee could improve more.

 Notes
The songs for the remaining acts were chosen by the public.
With XOX eliminated, Minogue had only one act (Brothers3) left in the competition. Minogue lost her third act within four weeks of the live shows, all of which were chosen as her top three for the live shows. Her remaining act Brothers3 were voted into the live shows as the wildcard.
On 6 September 2014, the performances of four acts entered the ARIA Singles Chart. Reigan Derry's performance of "Stay with Me" debuted at number 20, Brothers3's performance of "Hey Brother" debuted at number 58, Sydnee Carter's performance of "Say Something" debuted at number 73, and Jason Heerah's performance of "Higher Ground" debuted at number 98. On 19 September 2014, Derry's performance debuted at number 28 on the New Zealand Singles Chart.

Week 5 (7/8 September)
 Theme: Latest and Greatest
 Group performance: "Jump (for My Love)"
 Celebrity performers: Hilary Duff ("All About You") and Ariana Grande ("Problem", "Bang Bang" and "Break Free")

 Judges' vote to eliminate
 Redfoo: Sydnee Carter – backed his own act, Jason Heerah.
 Keating: Jason Heerah – backed his own act, Sydnee Carter.
 Bassingthwaighte: Sydnee Carter – felt that she had not seen the best of Carter and complained about her lack of consistency.
 Minogue: Sydnee Carter – stated that Heerah had improved that week.

Notes
During the live decider on Monday night, for the first time in the show's history, and only for one week, the safe contestants' names were called in descending order of the number of public votes they received.
On 13 September 2014, the performances of three acts entered the ARIA Singles Chart. Dean Ray's performance of "Budapest" debuted at number 15, Reigan Derry's performance of "Bang Bang" debuted at number 53, and Brothers3's performance of "Pompeii" debuted at number 91. On 26 September 2014, Ray's performance debuted at number 29 on the New Zealand Singles Chart.

Week 6 (14/15 September)
 Theme: Rock
 Group performance: "Maps"
 Celebrity performers: Nathaniel Willemse ("Live Louder") and Meghan Trainor ("All About That Bass")

 Judges' vote to eliminate
 Redfoo: Caitlyn Shadbolt – backed his own act, Rochelle Pitt.
 Keating: Rochelle Pitt – backed his own act, Caitlyn Shadbolt.
 Due to Bassingthwaighte's absence, three unanimous votes were required for an act to be eliminated. However, as Redfoo and Keating backed their own acts, Minogue was not required to vote and the result went to deadlock. Minogue refused to say who she would have voted to eliminate, implying she would have sent the result to deadlock if Bassingthwaighte was present.

With the acts in the bottom two receiving one vote each, the result went to deadlock and reverted to the earlier public vote. Pitt was eliminated as the act with the fewest public votes.

 Notes
Bassingthwaighte was absent for the live decider because she had attended the funeral of her manager Mark Byrne earlier that day.
On 20 September 2014, the performances of two acts entered the ARIA Singles Chart. Marlisa Punzalan's performance of "Nothing Else Matters" debuted at number 87 and Dean Ray's performance of "New Sensation" debuted at number 90.

Week 7 (21/23 September)
 Theme: Judges' Challenge
 Group performance: "Best Day of My Life" with American Authors
 Celebrity performers: Ricki-Lee Coulter ("Happy Ever After") and American Authors ("Believer")

 Judges' vote to eliminate
 Keating: Tee – Backed his own act, Caitlyn Shadbolt. Based on the performances from previous weeks, he chose to send home Tee.
 Bassingthwaighte: Caitlyn Shadbolt – Backed her own act, Tee. She chose to send home Shadbolt because she felt that Heerah had handled the different genres in each week better and had been more consistent.
 Minogue: Caitlyn Shadbolt – felt she was not as strong as Tee and Heerah.
 Redfoo: Tee – Backed his own act, Jason Heerah. Redfoo chose to send home Tee because he felt that Tee had not found himself as an artist yet.

With Shadbolt and Tee both receiving two votes each, Heerah was announced safe automatically and the result went to deadlock and reverted to the earlier public vote. Tee was eliminated as the act with the fewest public votes.

 Notes
 This week's live decider aired on Tuesday night due to the Seven Network's coverage of the 2014 Brownlow Medal.
For the first time in the show's history, and only for this week, the final showdown in the live decider consisted of a bottom three.
On 27 September 2014, the performances of four acts entered the ARIA Singles Chart. Jason Heerah's performance of "Latch" debuted at number 38, Dean Ray's performance of "Stolen Dance" debuted at number 40, Reigan Derry's performance of "Dog Days Are Over" debuted at number 61, and Brothers3's performance of "I'm Gonna Be (500 Miles)" debuted at number 75.

Week 8 (28/29 September)
 Theme: Aussie Week
 Group performance: "I'm Ready" with AJR 
 Celebrity performers: The Veronicas ("You Ruin Me") and Ed Sheeran ("Thinking Out Loud" and "Don't")

 Judges' vote to eliminate
 Keating: Jason Heerah – stated that it was a very tough decision.
 Bassingthwaighte: Jason Heerah – based on whose performances were downloaded on iTunes more.
 Minogue: Reigan Derry – based on whose final showdown performance had the most connection and moved her the most.
 Redfoo: Reigan Derry – could not send either of his own acts home and sent the result to deadlock.

With the acts in the bottom two receiving two votes each, the result went to deadlock and reverted to the earlier public vote. Heerah was eliminated as the act with the fewest public votes.

Notes
Brothers3 became the first group to not land in the bottom two in week eight. All other groups since season two have passed week eight after surviving the bottom two.
On 4 October 2014, the performances of two acts entered the ARIA Singles Chart. Dean Ray's performance of "Into My Arms" debuted at number 36, and Reigan Derry's performance of "Burn for You" debuted at number 78.

Week 9: Quarter-Final (5/6 October)
 Theme: Killer Tracks and Curveballs
 Group performance: "Am I Wrong" with Nico & Vinz
 Celebrity performers: Taylor Henderson ("Host of Angels") and Nico & Vinz ("In Your Arms")

 Judges' vote to eliminate
 Keating: Dean Ray – backed his own act, Caitlyn Shadbolt.
 Redfoo: Caitlyn Shadbolt – went with his gut and based on whose performances were more consistent.
 Bassingthwaighte: Caitlyn Shadbolt – backed her own act, Dean Ray.
 Minogue: Caitlyn Shadbolt – based her decision on the number of standing ovations Ray had received.

 Notes
On 11 October 2014, the performances of three acts entered the ARIA Singles Chart. Dean Ray's performances of "Crying" and "Lonely Boy" debuted at numbers 26 and 99 respectively, Brothers3's performances of "Que Sera" and "The Sound of Silence" debuted at numbers 42 and 48 respectively, and Marlisa Punzalan's performances of "Somewhere Over the Rainbow" and "Titanium" debuted at numbers 93 and 96 respectively.

Week 10: Semi-Final (12/13 October)
 Theme: Power and Passion
 Group performance: "Reach Out I'll Be There" / "You Can't Hurry Love" with Boyzone 
 Celebrity performers: The Script ("Superheroes") and 5 Seconds of Summer ("Amnesia" and "Good Girls")

Judges' vote to send through to the Grand Final
Minogue: Marlisa Punzalan – stated that Punzalan had improved more.
Keating: Marlisa Punzalan – backed his own act, Marlisa Punzalan.
Redfoo: Reigan Derry – backed his own act, Reigan Derry.
Bassingthwaighte: Reigan Derry – went with her gut.

With the acts in the bottom two receiving two votes each, the result went to deadlock and reverted to the earlier public vote. Punzalan advanced to the final as the act with the most public votes.

Notes
During the semi-final week, each judge had one act left in the competition. After Derry's elimination, Redfoo became the only judge with no act in the grand final.
On 18 October 2014, the performances of three acts entered the ARIA Singles Chart. Dean Ray's performances of "Folsom Prison Blues" / "That's All Right (Mama)" and "The Power of Love" debuted at numbers 49 and 65 respectively, Derry's performance of "Only Love Can Hurt Like This" debuted at number 63, and Brothers3's performance of "Massachusetts" debuted at number 87.

Week 11: Final (19/20 October)
19 October
 Group performance: "Lovers on the Sun" (performed by top three finalists)

Brothers3 received the fewest public votes and were automatically eliminated.

20 October
Group performances:
"Dark Horse" (performed by top thirteen finalists)
"Beneath Your Beautiful" (performed by top two finalists)
 Celebrity performers: Olly Murs ("Wrapped Up"), Jessica Mauboy ("Can I Get a Moment?"), Guy Sebastian ("Mama Ain't Proud") and Taylor Swift ("Shake It Off")

Notes
For the first time in season six, there was no theme for the grand final.
On 25 October 2014, performances from the top three finalists entered the ARIA Singles Chart. Dean Ray's performance of "Bette Davis Eyes" debuted at number 33, Marlisa Punzalan's performance of "Yesterday" debuted at number 67, and Brothers3's performance of "Safe & Sound" debuted at number 82.

Charity single
In September 2014, the top six finalists and Australian pop group Justice Crew recorded a cover of Pharrell Williams' song "Happy" for the Sony Foundation's youth cancer program, You Can. Their version was released on the iTunes Store on 29 September 2014, as a charity single to help raise funds for You Can to establish specialised youth cancer centres across Australia.

Reception

Controversy and criticism

XOX were criticised by Keating and Redfoo after their performance of Deee-Lite's "Groove Is in the Heart" during the third live show. Redfoo said they look "like a pop act but it's not sounding like a pop act", while Keating said their performance was lacking and "just didn't feel it fired, it just didn't happen. You've got to get it right." However, Bassingthwaighte disagreed with their comments and said she loved the performance. The criticism divided the judging panel as "it quickly became a battle of the sexes". XOX's mentor Minogue told Keating that she was personally offended by his comments because she felt it was hypocritical as he did not like her criticising his acts. She then went on to say, "We took on board the feedback [from last week] so we took this song and did a club remix of it. If you're not used to that and you don't go to clubs anymore because you're too old then I'm sorry."

Following XOX's elimination in week four of the live shows, Minogue stated that she believed the group were the victim of unwarranted criticism, saying that "Other acts have faltered but have not had the same criticism. I feel really strongly about that." In an interview with TV Week, group member Nada-Leigh Nasser believed that Keating's consistently negative comments could have played a part in their elimination: "Ronan is very influential and his opinion does matter. We accept any criticism we get because we know it's all constructive in the end. But we do acknowledge that it would affect a lot of people's opinions."

More controversy occurred after Reigan Derry's performance of Radiohead's "Creep" during the ninth live show, when Minogue criticised Derry's outfit for being too oversexualised. Derry, who used to be a member of the girl band Scarlett Belle, had stated in her audition for The X Factor that she felt people did not get to see the real her because of how oversexualised the band was. Minogue told her: "I watched again your first audition and I listened to every word you said. You know, oversexualised and you just wanted to sing the song and you just wanted everybody to listen to your voice. In the close-ups of this outfit, if you don't want to be oversexualised...I'm getting mixed messages." Derry's mentor Redfoo defended her outfit by saying that it was not oversexualised, before taking aim at Minogue's outfit. He said, "Look what you're wearing! You want to talk about oversexualised, look what you're wearing! Let's get real. Let's get really real. This is see through!" During the ninth live decider show the following night, Redfoo apologised to Minogue for the comments he made about her outfit. Minogue accepted his apology and said "I've had a chat with Reigan and we've sorted it out. We are all moving on."

Ratings
 Colour key:
  – Highest rating during the season
  – Lowest rating during the season

References

External links
 The X Factor at Yahoo!7

Season 6
2014 Australian television seasons
Australia 06